Théo Luis Fonseca (born 11 June 2000) is a professional footballer who plays as a winger for the Primeira Liga club Famalicão. Born in France, he is a youth international for Portugal.

Club career
Fonseca is a youth product of the French club Nancy and the Portuguese club Vitória Guimarães. He transferred to Felgueiras in the summer of 2020, and began his senior career with them in the Campeonato de Portugal that season. He was named player of the season in the 2021–22 season in the Campeonato de Portugal, which earned him a transfer to the Primeira Liga club Famalicão on 6 June 2022. He made his professional debut with Famalicão as a late substitute in a 3–0 Primeira Liga loss to Braga on 12 August 2022.

International career
Born in France, Fonseca is of Portuguese descent through his father. He represented the Portugal U18s in 2018.

References

External links
 
 

2000 births
Living people
People from Ermont
Portuguese footballers
Portugal youth international footballers
French footballers
French people of Portuguese descent
Association football wingers
F.C. Felgueiras 1932 players
F.C. Famalicão players
Primeira Liga players
Campeonato de Portugal (league) players